Helen Ryan (born 16 June 1938, in Liverpool, Lancashire) is a British actress, who is notable for playing several royal roles.

The Liverpool native played Queen Alexandra in the British television series Edward the Seventh, for which she received a BAFTA nomination in 1975. She also played Princess Alexandra in the 1980 movie The Elephant Man, and Queen Wilhelmina of the Netherlands in the 2002 television drama Bertie and Elizabeth. Her other credits include Madame Balzac in the TV series Prometheus: The Life of Balzac (1975), Mrs McFarlane in the Sherlock Holmes story The Norwood Builder, and films such as Clash of Loyalties (1983), Misunderstood (1984) and The Hawk (1993).

She was formerly married to the theatre director Guy Slater with whom she had a daughter Rebecca and a son Daniel.

References

External links

Living people
British film actresses
British television actresses
1938 births
Actresses from Liverpool